The National Film Archive of India (NFAI) was established as a media unit of the Ministry of Information and Broadcasting in February 1964. It is was a member of the International Federation of Film Archives.

In March 2022, it was merged with National Film Development Corporation.

Objectives 
Its three principal objectives are: to trace, acquire and preserve for posterity the heritage of Indian cinema; to classify, document data and undertake research relating to films; to act as a centre for the dissemination of film culture.

Organization 
With headquarters at Pune, Maharashtra, NFAI had three regional offices at Bangalore, Calcutta and Thiruvananthapuram. Developed from scratch by P. K. Nair, NFAI's activities related to the dissemination of film culture were manifold. Its Distribution Library had about 25 active members throughout the country and it also organized joint screening programmes on a weekly, fortnightly and monthly basis in six important centres. It had over 10,000 films, over 10,000 books, over 10,000 film scripts, and over 50,000 photographs. Another important programme was the film teaching scheme comprising long and short-term Film Appreciation courses conducted in collaboration with the Film and Television Institute of India (FTII) and other educational and cultural institutions. At the International level, NFAI supplied several Indian classics for major screening programmes.

The NFAI's archive kept a stock of films, video cassettes, DVDs, books, posters, stills, press clippings, slides, audio CDs, and disc records of Indian cinema dating back to the 1910s.

State of preservation 
On 8 January 2003, a large fire caused a massive destruction in the vault of NFAI housed in the Prabhat Studio complex of Film and Television Institute of India in Pune, in which unduplicated irreplaceable films with a nitrate base were destroyed. Ravi Shankar Prasad the then Minister of State, Ministry of Information and Broadcasting, Government of India announced in the Rajya Sabha that 607 films in 5,097 reels were lost in the fire. Among the greatest loss were films by Dadasaheb Phalke including: Raja Harishchandra (1913), Lanka Dahan (1917) and Kaliya Mardan (1919). Important films produced by Prabhat Film Company, Wadia Movietone, Bombay Talkies and New Theatres, were also gutted, namely: Bhakta Prahlada (1932), Amar Jyoti (1936), Manoos (1939), Aage Badho (1947) and others.

In March 2019, the Comptroller and Auditor General of India reported that 31,000 reels at the NFAI were reported lost or destroyed, when it audited the records between May 1, 2015, and September 30, 2017.

References

External links

National Film Archive of India Official Website
National Film Archive of India YouTube Channel

1964 establishments in Maharashtra
Government agencies established in 1964
Film archives in India
Archives in India
Film organisations in India
Film preservation
Organisations based in Pune
Ministry of Information and Broadcasting (India)